One hundred thirty-two Guggenheim Fellowships were awarded in 1946. Sixty of these were awarded as part of the post-service program, which provided fellowships to otherwise qualified artists and scholars who were taken away from their studies due to the war.

1946 U.S. and Canadian Fellows

1946 Latin American and Caribbean Fellows

See also
 Guggenheim Fellowship
 List of Guggenheim Fellowships awarded in 1945
 List of Guggenheim Fellowships awarded in 1947

References

1946
1946 awards